Yellow Rock is a suburb of Wollongong in the City of Shellharbour in New South Wales, Australia.

References 

Suburbs of Wollongong
City of Shellharbour